The 2022–23 Northeastern Huskies men's basketball team represented Northeastern University in the 2022–23 NCAA Division I men's basketball season. The Huskies, led by 17th-year head coach Bill Coen, played their home games at Matthews Arena in Boston, Massachusetts as members of the Colonial Athletic Association.

Previous season
The Huskies finished the 2021–22 season 9–22, 2–16 in CAA play to finish in last place. As the No. 9 seed, they defeated No. 8 seed William & Mary in the first round of the CAA tournament, before falling to top-seeded Towson in the quarterfinals.

Roster

Schedule and results

|-
!colspan=12 style=| Non-conference regular season

|-
!colspan=12 style=| CAA Regular Season

|-
!colspan=9 style=| CAA tournament

Sources

References

Northeastern Huskies men's basketball seasons
Northeastern
Northeastern Huskies men's basketball
Northeastern Huskies men's basketball
Northeastern Huskies men's basketball
Northeastern Huskies men's basketball